Renato Favinha Marques (born 14 January 1996 in Loulé) is a Portuguese footballer who plays for S.C. Olhanense, as a midfielder.

Football career
On 22 February 2015, Marques made his professional debut with Olhanense in a 2014–15 Segunda Liga match against Santa Clara.

Personal
His father Ademar Marques was also a footballer and played for the national team.

References

External links

Stats and profile at LPFP 

1996 births
Living people
People from Loulé
Portuguese footballers
Association football midfielders
Liga Portugal 2 players
S.C. Olhanense players
Sportspeople from Faro District